David Yurman Enterprises LLC is a privately held American jewellery company founded by David Yurman (born October 12, 1942, in New York City) and Sybil Yurman (born December 10, 1942, in New York City). Its headquarters is situated in New York City. There are currently many David Yurman boutiques in the United States and internationally.

History

Early years 
David Yurman grew up in the Bronx, a borough of New York City. At age 15 he met a Cuban welder and sculptor named Ernesto Gonzalez, who taught him welding techniques. After a year at New York University, Yurman left college and spent the next five years hitchhiking between New York's Greenwich Village, Venice, California, and Big Sur, partaking in the Beatnik and San Francisco Renaissance cultural movements. In the early 1960s, Yurman apprenticed for several years with modernist sculptor Jacques Lipchitz. He also established his own studio in Greenwich Village. Here, he worked for various sculptors, including Theodore Roszak and Edward Meshekoff, doing large-scale public works. At Lincoln Center, Yurman helped create the railings of the promenade in the David H. Koch Theater, designed by Phillip Johnson. He also worked on the eagle sculpture commissioned for the James L. Watson Court of International Trade in New York City. In the late 1960s, Yurman became the shop foreman of sculptor Hans Van de Bovenkamp. In this studio, Yurman met the painter Sybil Kleinrock, his future wife, and business partner.

The transition to jewellery 
In the early 1970s, Yurman and Kleinrock moved to Carmel in upstate New York. They formed a company called Putnam Art Works which specialized in sculptural jewellery. Throughout the next decade they exhibited their jewellery designs, sculptures and paintings at various galleries and craft fairs. They became key figures in the American craft movement. Through Putnam Art Works, the Yurmans learned about the marketplace for fine crafts and artisanal jewellery. They married in 1979 and founded the David Yurman company a year later, with Sybil Yurman acting as a co-creator and collaborator in all facets of the business. Their son, Evan Yurman, was born on January 31, 1982.

In 1977, Yurman was chosen as one of twelve jewellers to exhibit at the first New Designer Gallery at the Retail Jewelers of America Show (RJA) in New York City. This exhibit is seen as a pivotal moment for the connection between traditional artisans and established merchandisers. During the 1980s and 1990s, the David Yurman company was at the forefront of the emerging category of American designer jewellery.

In 2003, Evan Yurman joined the company, and in 2004 he became the Design Director of the Men's and Timepiece Collections. In 2009, he launched an exclusive collection of high jewellery and began overseeing the company's Wedding Collection, which launched in 2006.

Creation of cable 
In 1982, Yurman designed what became his signature piece, the cable bracelet: a twisted helix adorned with gemstones on its end caps. He called the bracelet and related designs "Renaissance," and it has become one of his most enduring collections. Created through an innovative process Yurman pioneered, the cable motif was awarded two rare design trademarks in the United States since his design was instantly recognizable. His cable design evolved to become the thread that connects all of his collections.

Collections and jewelry style 
Yurman creates collections in sterling silver and gold and is notably recognized for his mixed metal designs. Many sterling pieces have pavé diamonds—notably, he was the first major jeweller to set diamonds in silver. He calls this category Silver Ice, where he shifted the luxurious use of diamonds to a more daily occurrence. Yurman is also known for inventive stone cuts, most notably the cushion cut for the Albion Collection. The men's division, unique in the industry, is known for featuring non-traditional materials such as titanium, carbon fibre, and meteorites.

An advertising revolution 
In 2000, David and Sybil Yurman collaborated with the David Lipman advertising agency and photographer Peter Lindbergh for their first advertising campaign. The was shot in St. Barts with Amber Valletta as the face of the brand. It was a lifestyle campaign, arguing jewellery could be an 'emotional experience for the wearer. In the following years, prominent models and actresses such as Kate Moss, Naomi Campbell, Naomi Watts, Gisele Bündchen, Joan Smalls, Taylor Hill, and Natalia Vodianova have also appeared in David Yurman advertising campaigns.

The cable book 
In 2017, Rizzoli published David Yurman Cable, the brand's first book. The monograph explores cable as an archetypal form and Yurman's artistic use of it as his signature through essays by Paul Greenhalgh, William Norwich, and Carine Roitfeld, and a foreword by Sybil and David Yurman.

Judgment against counterfeiters 
In January 2019, the United States District Court for the Southern District of New York entered a default judgment in favour of David Yurman, awarding the company $1,550,000 and a permanent injunction against 31 defendants. The defendants operated a network of websites infringing on the company's trademarks, selling counterfeit David Yurman goods.

Honors and awards 
1980 – Intergold Award from the World Gold Council for a gold wire and diamond necklace design that was the forerunner of the cable motif

1981 – Designer of the Year from the Cultured Pearl Associations of America and Japan for innovative use of pearls

2003 – Star Gazer award from Fashion Group International

2004 – Lifetime Achievement Award at the JIC Gem Awards

2007 – Style Etoile Award from Savannah College of Art and Design

2011 – Lifetime Achievement Award from the American Gem Society, the first time a jewellery designer received this award

2013 – Couture Human Spirit Award from the Couture Show

2013 – Annual Visionaries! Award from the Museum of Arts and Design

Giving back 
The Yurmans formalized a lifelong commitment to charitable causes by establishing the David & Sybil Yurman Humanitarian and Arts Foundation in 2001. The foundation presents David Yurman Angel Awards to individuals who support charities, and the arts through their donations and volunteerism. Past recipients include Steven Spielberg, Elton John, and Leonard Slatkin. The foundation also provides support for a variety of charitable initiatives, including The Whitney Museum of American Art, Studio In a School, The Breast Cancer Research Foundation, and the Make-A-Wish Foundation. David Yurman also created a pin for the Silver Shield Foundation benefitting the families of New York City firefighters and policemen. An avid horseback rider, David Yurman supports several charitable equestrian initiatives as well including Gallop NYC therapeutic horsemanship and the Gleneayre Equestrian Foundation.

References

External links
Official website

Companies based in New York City
American jewellers
Fashion accessory brands
Luxury brands
Manufacturing companies established in 1980
Watch brands
1942 births
Living people
20th-century American Jews
21st-century American Jews